Beet River is a river in northern West Java, Indonesia.
It is a tributary of the Citarum River.

Geography
The river flows in the southwest area of Java with predominantly tropical rainforest climate (designated as Af in the Köppen-Geiger climate classification). The annual average temperature in the area is 26 °C. The warmest month is October, when the average temperature is around 28 °C, and the coldest is January, at 25 °C. The average annual rainfall is 2970 mm. The wettest month is December, with an average of 475 mm rainfall, and the driest is September, with 22 mm rainfall.

See also
List of rivers of Indonesia
List of rivers of Java

References

External links
  BBWS Citarum 
  Waspada Permukaan Air Cibeet Naik

Rivers of West Java
Rivers of Indonesia